Glenea lineata is a species of beetle in the family Cerambycidae. It was described by Charles Joseph Gahan in 1897.

Subspecies
 Glenea lineata ihai Hayashi, 1960
 Glenea lineata lineata Gahan, 1897
 Glenea lineata okinawana Ohbayashi & Ohbayashi, 1965
 Glenea lineata ryukyuensis Breuning & Ohbayashi, 1964
 Glenea lineata sauteri Schwarzer, 1925

References

lineata
Beetles described in 1897